In Chinese mythology, Jiutian Xuannü is the goddess of war, sex, and longevity.

Etymology 
This goddess was initially known as Xuannü. The name has been variously translated as the "Dark Lady" or the "Mysterious Lady" in English. In the late Tang dynasty, the Daoist master Du Guangting (850–933) created the title Jiutian Xuannü (九天玄女), adding Jiutian (meaning "[of the] Nine Heavens"), to refer to the goddess.

She is closely related to Sunü, who is her divine sister. Both their names combined, as xuansu zhidao, signify the Daoist arts of the bedchamber.

Stories
 
The Yongcheng Jixian Lu, written by the Daoist master Du Guangting (850–933), contains a biographical account of Jiutian Xuannü. It mentions that Jiutian Xuannü is the teacher of Huangdi and the disciple of Xi Wangmu. The work relates a story about the goddess appearing before Huangdi during a time when the latter was in conflict with Chiyou. Chiyou had caused a great mist, which was so impenetrable that it obscured day and night. Huangdi would dwell in the mist for several days. Jiutian Xuannü rode a cinnabar phoenix, holding phosphors and clouds as reins, into the great mist. She wore variegated kingfisher-feather garments of nine colors. Huangdi greeted her and received her command. Jiutian Xuannü said: "I base myself on the teachings of the Grand Supreme. If you have any doubts, you may question me." Huangdi responded: "[Chiyou] is cruelly crossing us. His poison is harming all the black-haired people. The four seas are sobbing. No one can protect his own nature or life. I want the art of winning a myriad victories in a myriad battles. Can I cut the harm facing my people?" Thereupon the goddess bestowed various objects and artifacts. The following is a few of the listed items:

 The Talismans of the Martial Tokens of the Six Jia Cyclicals and the Six Ren Cyclicals
 The Book by which the Five Emperors of the Numinous Treasure Force Ghosts and Spirits into Service
 The Seal of the Five Bright-Shiners for Regulating Demons and Communicating with Spirits
 The Formula of the Five Yin and Five Yang for Concealing the Jia Cyclicals
 Charts for Grabbing the Mechanism of Victory and Defeat of the Grand Unity from the Ten Essences and Four Spirits
 Charts of the Five Marchmounts and the Four Holy Rivers
 Instructions in the Essentials of Divining Slips

It was subsequently noted that Huangdi was able to defeat Chiyou and ascend to heaven on the basis of the items bestowed by Jiutian Xuannü.

Associations

Warfare
The association of this goddess with warfare is derived from the Longyu Hetu, presumably produced during the Xin dynasty. This text describes the manifestation of the goddess herself in front of Huangdi during his conflict against Chiyou:  Her intervention in warfare is a common narrative in Daoist texts, such as in texts from the Zhongshu Bu in the Daozang.

Martial magic

A set of Daoist texts, produced after the Tang dynasty, associates the goddess with magical capabilities, such as the skill of invisibility and the method of mobilizing the stars of the Northern Dipper to protect the state. The Lingbao Liuding Mifa specifies that Jiutian Xuannü's magic is martial in origin.

Jiutian Xuannü has the ability to magically conceal the body and her power is exercised through the Six Ding Jade Maidens who are her acolytes. According to the Lingbao Liuding Mifa, the Jade Maidens perform specific tasks during the concealment: the Jade Maiden of Dingmao conceals one's physical body, the Jade Maiden of Dingsi conceals one's destiny, the Jade Maiden of Dinghai conceals one's fortune, the Jade Maiden of Dingyou conceals one's hun soul, the Jade Maiden of Dingwei conceals one's po soul, and the Jade Maiden of Dingchou conceals one's spirit. Achieving invisibility is seen as a military strategy to defeat enemies and protect the state, as the text claims that practitioners must first learn to conceal their bodies if they hope to expel evil and return to righteousness. The goddess and the six maidens together represent the yin force in the universe, which is believed to directly result in the concealment of the body, linking their magic of invisibility with their femininity.

The Micang Tongxuan Bianhua Liuyin Dongwei Dunjia Zhenjing, written in the early Northern Song period, gives an incantation associated with Jiutian Xuannü. By reciting this incantation and performing the paces of Yu, invisibility to others was said to be achieved. In the Baopuzi, written by Ge Hong (b. 283), the paces of Yu are described as elements of the divinatory system of dunjia (translated "Hidden Stem") from which the immediate position in the space-time structure of the six ding could be calculated. The six ding are the spirits who are responsible for the position of the irregular gate, which represents a rift in the universe. The irregular gate must be approached by performing the paces of Yu and serves as the entrance to the emptiness of the otherworld in which invisibility to evil influences is achieved.

The Beidou Zhifa Wuwei Jing states that Jiutian Xuannü taught the method to mobilize the stars of the Northern Dipper to Yuan Qing, an official during the transition from the Sui to the Tang dynasty. The method is known as Beidou Shi'er Xing (translated "Twelve Stars of the Northern Dipper"). The Shangqing Tianxin Zhengfa, produced in the Southern Song period, gives an incantation entitled Tiangang Shenzhou (translated "Incantation of the Heavenly Mainstay") that accompanies the method.

Longevity
The goddess Jiutian Xuannü appears in several works of physiological microcosmology in which the human body is seen as a microcosm of the universe and where the gods are present within. These texts locate Jiutian Xuannü along the central median of the body and associate her with the circulation of breath, which nourishes the vital spirit and provides longevity.

Jiutian Xuannü appears at least three times in the Huangting Jing, where the adept is instructed to send down his breath to enter the goddess' mouth.

The Taishang Laojun Zhongjing, probably dating to the 5th century, mentions that she is "located between the kidneys, dressed only in the white of Venus and the brilliant stars. Her pearl of Great Brilliance shines to illuminate the inside of the adept's whole body, so that he can extend his years and not die."

In the Laozi Zhongjing, Jiutian Xuannü is described as one of the three deities who are sitting on divine tortoises. The author comments: "The Mysterious Woman is the mother of the Way of the void and nothingness." The text gives instructions to adepts: "Close your eyes and meditate on a white breath between your shoulders. In its centre is a white tortoise. On top of the tortoise is the Mysterious Woman." There are two governors beside her, which adepts are instructed to summon by saying: "Governor of Destiny and Governor of the Registers, pare so-and-so's name from the death list and inscribe it on the Life List of the Jade Calendar." This ritual therefore points to a procedure in which a long life is promised.

Since the 3rd century AD, Jiutian Xuannü has been associated with alchemy. In Ge Hong's Baopuzi, it is noted that the goddess Jiutian Xuannü helps prepare elixirs with other deities, that adepts erected altars to the goddess when they create elixirs of metal, and that she had discussed calisthenics and diet with Huangdi. During the Song dynasty, the goddess was closely associated with neidan (inner alchemy).

Sexuality
While most books bearing Jiutian Xuannü's name were about warfare, books that focus on her link to sexuality also exist. The Xuannü Jing and the Sunü Jing, both dating to the Han dynasty, were handbooks in dialogue form about sex. Texts from the Xuannü Jing  have been partly incorporated into the Sui dynasty edition of the Sunü Jing. From the Han dynasty onwards, these handbooks would be familiar to the upper class. On the other side, during the Han dynasty, Wang Chong had criticized the sexual arts as "not only harming the body but infringing upon the nature of man and woman."

During the Tang dynasty and earlier periods, Jiutian Xuannü was often associated with the sexual arts. The Xuannü Jing remained a familiar work among the literati during the Sui and Tang dynasties. The Dongxuanzi Fangzhong Shu, which was likely written by the 7th-century poet Liu Zongyuan, contains explicit descriptions of the sexual arts that was supposedly transmitted from Jiutian Xuannü.

The sexual practices, that Jiutian Xuannü supposedly taught, were often compared to alchemy and physiological procedures for prolonging life. In Ge Hong's Baopuzi, there's a passage in which Jiutian Xuannü tells Huangdi that sexual techniques are "like the intermingling of water and fire—it can kill or bring new life depending upon whether or not one uses the correct methods."

Development

The goddess Jiutian Xuannü was actively worshiped by the ancient Chinese, but the extent of the worship diminished after the Han dynasty. Over the following centuries, she was gradually assimilated into Daoism. During the Tang dynasty, contrary views about Jiutian Xuannü coexisted. In this period, the rise of Daoism gave way to a new imagery of a high goddess of war who won by magical and intellectual means, and who transmitted the arts of immortality. The aspects of sexuality, victory over enemies in warfare, and everlasting life was slowly modified to fit this new image. Moreover, the Daoist Du Guangting attempted to expunge all the heterodox and crude elements from Jiutian Xuannü's popular legends, such as the erotic and sexually-empowering nature of the goddess, to create a new image of a martial goddess that was appropriate for the Shangqing school of Daoism.

In the Ming dynasty, Jiutian Xuannü officially became a celestial protectress and was venerated as a tutelary goddess of the state. In 1493, Empress Zhang (1470–1541), who was the wife of the Hongzhi Emperor, was ordained and her ordination was certified in a scroll entitled The Ordination of Empress Zhang, which contains numerous images of deities (but not Jiutian Xuannü) and an inscription composed by the Daoist master Zhang Xuanqing (d. 1509) of the Zhengyi school. This inscription ranks Jiutian Xuannü above all other celestial warriors by placing her ahead of the divine categories Generals, Marshals, Heavenly Soldiers, the Six Ding Jade Maidens, and the Six Jia Generals. Furthermore, it granted her the expanded official title Jiutian Zhanxie Huzheng Xuannü (translated "Dark Lady of the Nine Heavens who Slays Evil and Protects Righteousness"). The Lingbao Liuding Mifa associates the phrase "slaying evil and protecting righteousness" with the goddess and emphasizes that "in order to slay evil and return to righteousness, one first needs to know how to become invisible".

The veneration and elevation of Jiutian Xuannü may have had an underlying political rationale, as it positioned an aristocratic family over another. The relationship of Empress Zhang and Jiutian Xuannü closely paralleled the relationship of the Ming emperors and Xuanwu, another important deity in Daoism, which promoted the empress and her family's position in the imperial court. This was during a time of strife between the Zhang family and Zhou family (of Empress Dowager Zhou, the grandmother of the Hongzhi Emperor), the latter who adhered to Buddhism. Jiutian Xiannü is a fertility goddess, which also may have contributed to Empress Zhang's worship of the deity.

In contemporary times, she has also been considered a patron of marriage and fertility, and is regarded by believers to have been responsible for the customs in Chinese culture by which people with the same surnames have been forbidden to marry.

Appearance

In the Taishang Laojun Zhongjing, Jiutian Xuannü is described as being dressed only in the white of Venus and the brilliant stars, with her pearl of Great Brilliance shining in illumination. When Jiutian Xuannü appeared before Huangdi as narrated in the Yongcheng Jixian Lu, she wore variegated kingfisher-feather garments of nine colors and rode a cinnabar phoenix with phosphors and clouds as reins.

The physical appearance of Jiutian Xuannü has been described in a poem that appears in the Rongyu Tang edition, published in the Ming dynasty, of the novel Water Margin:

Popular culture
Jiutian Xuannü appears as a character in the 2007 Hong Kong film It's a Wonderful Life, the 1980s Chinese television series Outlaws of the Marsh, and the 1985 Hong Kong television series The Yang's Saga.

She is featured in the mobile game Tower of Saviors.

Notes

References

Bibliography

 
 
 
 

Chinese goddesses
Health goddesses
Love and lust goddesses
Magic goddesses
War goddesses